Gossolengo (  or ) is a comune (municipality) in the province of Piacenza in the Italian region Emilia-Romagna, located about  northwest of Bologna and about  southwest of Piacenza, in the valley of the Trebbia river.

Gossolengo borders the following municipalities: Gazzola, Gragnano Trebbiense, Piacenza, Podenzano, Rivergaro.

The area's economy is traditionally based on agriculture, thought the vicinity to Piacenza has boosted a considerable industrial and construction boom in recent times.

The Etruscan artifact dubbed "Liver of Piacenza" was found in the nearby in 1877.

Demographic evolution

References

Cities and towns in Emilia-Romagna